Michelle Phan (born April 11, 1987) is an American beauty YouTuber. She is the founder and owner of the multimillion-dollar cosmetics line EM Cosmetics.

Early life
Michelle Phan was born on April 11, 1987, in Boston, Massachusetts. Both her parents were of Vietnamese origin. Phan has an elder brother and younger half-sister. According to Phan, her biological father left the family when she was young. Her mother remarried but eventually left Phan's step-father after years of abuse. Phan, her brother, and her half-sister followed their mother to Tampa, Florida, where she attended Tampa Bay Technical High School.

Phan attended Ringling College of Art and Design but dropped out due to financial issues. In March 2014, Phan received her Honorary Doctorate of Arts degree from Ringling.

Career

In 2005, Phan had a personal blog in which she discussed different makeup tutorials and received requests for further instruction. She began posting tutorial vlogs on Xanga under the username Ricebunny and then began posting on YouTube in May 2007.

BuzzFeed featured two of Phan's "How To Get Lady Gaga's Eyes" makeup tutorials in 2009 and 2010, which helped them go viral and brought her over a million subscribers. In 2010, Lancôme made Phan their official video make-up artist after she featured some of their products in her videos, making her the company's first Vietnamese-American spokesperson.

In 2011, Phan co-founded MyGlam, a monthly beauty product subscription service. It launched in September 2012 and has since been renamed Ipsy. Ipsy is a sponsor of the Generation Beauty conference. Phan became a YouTube advertising partner and launched FAWN, a YouTube MCN (multi-channel network), in 2012.

On August 15, 2013, L'Oreal launched a new cosmetic line called EM Cosmetics by Michelle Phan, dedicating the brand to her mother. In April 2015, Phan bought L'Oreal's share of EM Cosmetics through Ipsy, which she confirmed on her Instagram in December 2016; she later acquired the company from Ipsy and relaunched it in April 2017. During this time, Phan also resigned from Ipsy in order to focus on EM Cosmetics.

In May 2014, Phan announced her partnership with Endemol Beyond USA to build a talent network to feature people from YouTube and create content for millennials. The ICON network, dedicated to "beauty, lifestyle and entertainment," launched in March 2015 online and on television via Roku. In September 2014, Phan partnered with Cutting Edge Group to launch Shift Music Group. Phan published a book with Random House in October 2014, titled Make Up: Your Life Guide to Beauty, Style, and Success -- Online and Off.

In 2015, Phan was named to the Inc. 30 under 30 and Forbes 30 under 30 lists. The same year, she raised $100 million to value the company Ipsy at over $500 million.

Phan abruptly went on hiatus from YouTube in 2015. On June 1, 2017, Phan posted her first video since the hiatus explaining why she took her break. Phan cited legal troubles, the failure of EM Cosmetics' initial launch, and her issues with self-image as what lead her to decide to take a break. She continued her hiatus until officially returning to YouTube in September 2019.

In 2021, Phan provided the voice of Blackberry Cookie, a character in the video game Cookie Run: Kingdom, which was uncredited in-game.

Copyright infringement lawsuit 
In July 2014, Ultra Records sued Phan in the United States District Court for Los Angeles for copyright infringement relating to the music used in her YouTube videos. Ultra sought up to $150,000 in damages per infringement for up to 50 instances of alleged infringement, for a total of up to $7.5 million. Phan's representatives stated that she had received permission from Ultra to use the music, and Phan filed a countersuit against Ultra Records on September 18, 2014, in the United States District Court for the Central District of California. In August 2015, both suit and countersuit were dropped when both parties agreed to settle out of court. The terms of the agreement were not made public.

Personal life 
Phan's sister-in-law is fellow beauty YouTuber Promise Phan. The two have collaborated on each other's channels throughout the years.

Awards and nominations

Publications

References

External links

 

1987 births
Living people
American make-up artists
American people of Vietnamese descent
People from Tampa, Florida
Video bloggers
Women video bloggers
American YouTubers
People from Boston
Beauty and makeup YouTubers
Ringling College of Art and Design alumni
American women bloggers
American bloggers
YouTube vloggers
Shorty Award winners
21st-century American women